The Great Outdoors was an Australian travel magazine series broadcast on the Seven Network. It began in 1993 and was broadcast regularly until 2009, with a short-lived revival in 2012.

History
Similar to its long time competitor Getaway, on the Nine Network, the program featured a team of reporters who travelled around Australia and overseas, reporting on travel destinations, tourist attractions and accommodation.

In 2002, the show was expanded to 60 minutes and moved to the Monday  timeslot, where it had stayed until 2006.

After suffering a gradual decline in ratings, the show moved to a new timeslot of  Saturdays from the 2007 season. On 28 April 2007, the show celebrated 600 episodes, making it one of the longest-running programs on Australian television. However, after further decline in ratings, The Great Outdoors was cancelled in August 2009. The show did briefly return in October 2012 for a revamped series with 8 episodes airing on a Saturday evening at 5pm, with the possibility of a new season in 2013 which did not eventuate.

Former presenters
 Bridget Adams (1994−2001)
 Ann-Maree Biggar (2004-2005)
 Adam Brand (2012)
 Penny Cook (1993–1996)
 Shelley Craft (2001–2007)
 Neil Crompton
 Laura Csortan (2000–2006)
 Andrew Daddo (1994), (2002–2008)
 Ernie Dingo (1993–2009)
 Andrew Dwyer (1994)
 Sophie Falkiner (1999–2005)
 Rachael Finch (2012)
 Sofie Formica (1993–1994)
 Jennifer Hawkins (2005–2009)
 Tony Johnston (1996), (1999−2001)
 Terasa Livingstone (1998−2001)
 Di Smith (1996–2006)
 Pete Wells (2012)
 Tom Williams (2001−2009), (2012)

See also 
 List of Australian television series
 List of programs broadcast by Seven Network
 List of longest-running Australian television series

References

External links 
 
 The Great Outdoors at the National Film and Sound Archive

Seven Network original programming
Australian non-fiction television series
1993 Australian television series debuts
2009 Australian television series endings
2012 Australian television series debuts
2012 Australian television series endings
Australian television series revived after cancellation
Australian travel television series